National Hill View Public School (NHVPS) is a private school in Rajarajeshwari Nagar, Bangalore, Karnataka, India, for pre-school to high school children. It was built by D. K Shivakumar. The school is affiliated with the Central Board of Secondary Education (CBSE). The current principal is Mrs. Anita Vinod Kumar (Since May 2018).

About the school 
NHVPS offers instruction in English. The school follows the 10+2 educational pattern. The school facilities include a primary school building and main school building. The primary school building is for students from Play Group 1 (Pre-Kindergarten) to the 6th Standard, and includes a built-in playground area. The main school building houses programs for 6th to 12th Standard. Prior to 2014 the school was said to have had a wonderful teaching staff especially in high school.

References 

Primary schools in Karnataka
High schools and secondary schools in Bangalore
Educational institutions established in 2001
2001 establishments in Karnataka